Elections to Ellesmere Port and Neston Borough Council were held on 6 May 1999. The whole council was up for election with boundary changes since the last election in 1998 increasing the number of seats by 3. The Labour Party stayed in overall control of the council.

Results

References
1999 Ellesmere Port and Neston election result

1999 English local elections
1999
1990s in Cheshire